"Happy New Millennium" is a song by Ami Suzuki, released as her ninth single under Sony Music Japan. The Maxi Single also included two B-sides with the finished "Rain of Tears" track. The single peaked at number two on the Oricon chart.

Information
Released in 1999, the song described the end of the 1000s and the beginning of the 2000s. However, after Suzuki was blacklisted from the music industry in September 2000, production and distribution of the single stopped in its entirety.

Track listing
Happy New Millennium
Rain of Tears
Winter Buzz
Happy New Millennium: TV Mix

Ami Suzuki songs
1999 singles
1999 songs
Songs written by Tetsuya Komuro
Songs written by Ami Suzuki
Sony Music Entertainment Japan singles